Hakim Ali Zardari (9 December 1930 – 24 May 2011)) was a Pakistani politician who served as a member of National Assembly of Pakistan from 1972 to 1977 and again from 1988 to 1990 and then again from 1993 to 1996.

Early life
He was born on 9 December 1930 in the village of Fatohal Zardari to Mohammad Hussain Zardari. His father's family were from the Zardari tribe of Baluchistan and was recruited by the British to be zamindars in Sindh. His mother was originally from Iraq. He received his initial education from mosque school and completed his matriculation from DC High School in Nawabshah.

Political career
Zardari started his political career in 1965 when he was elected member of the Nawabshah District Council and later was elected as the Mayor of District Nawabshah. He supported Fatima Jinnah in the 1965 presidential elections against Ayub Khan.

In 1970, he joined the Pakistan Peoples Party as a founding member. He also got elected head of the Zardari tribe in 1970.

He was elected to the National Assembly of Pakistan in 1970, 1988, and 1993.

He was imprisoned during the tenures of Nawaz Sharif and Pervaiz Musharraf and was implicated with his son for the murder of Federal Secretary Alam Baloch.

Business career and wealth
He built cinema houses in Hyderabad and Karachi and worked as a film distributor. He also produced a Sindhi film, Soorat.

He had a house in Normandy, France which he was accused of buying for 724 million dollars by the National Accountability Bureau, which filed a reference against him for having assets beyond source of income and was sentenced for five years of rigorous imprisonment, a fine of 18.5 million rupees and disqualified him from holding any elected office for 10 years. On health ground his house was declared as sub-jail.

On 24 January 2007, Sindh High Court overturned his conviction made by the accountability bureau.

He was also convicted in similar case in Lahore for making shady transactions with various organisations for establishing a tourist village at Rawalpindi National Park through Zardari Group. He was sentenced to 18 months in jail and asked to pay a fine of 20 million rupees but this was also overturned by Lahore High Court in 2002.

Personal life
He married twice—Bilquis Sultana (died November 2002) and Zareen Ara (died 22 June 2022)—and had four children—Asif Ali Zardari, Fouzia Zardari, Azra Peechoho and Faryal Talpur. He also had an adopted son Owais Muzaffar.

Death
Hakim Ali Zardari was admitted to the Pakistan Institute of Medical Sciences (PIMS) in March following multiple organ failure. He died in the hospital on 24 May 2011 at age 80.

References

External links
 Hakim Ali Zardari dies at 81 – The Nations
 Hakim Ali Zardari Interview

1930 births
2011 deaths
Baloch politicians
Pakistani industrialists
Pakistani landowners
Pakistan People's Party politicians
Pakistani prisoners and detainees
Pakistani people of Iraqi descent
Pakistani politicians convicted of corruption
Overturned convictions in Pakistan
Pakistani MNAs 1972–1977
Pakistani MNAs 1988–1990
Pakistani MNAs 1993–1996
People from Shaheed Benazir Abad District
Tumandars
Hakim